Jared Spool is an American writer, researcher, speaker, educator, and an expert on the subjects of usability, software, design, and research. He is the founding principal of User Interface Engineering (UIE), a research, training, and consulting firm that specializes in website and product usability. He is also an amateur magician. Spool attended Niskayuna High School in Niskayuna, NY.

Spool has been working in the field of usability and design since 1978, before the term usability was ever associated with computers.

Achievements and awards 
Under Spool's leadership, in 1996 UIE launched the User Interface Conference, an annual user experience research and design conference, which he chairs and delivers the keynotes for.

From 1998 until 2008, as an adjunct faculty member at Tufts University, Spool created and taught a unique curriculum for the Experience Design Management course at the Tufts Gordon Institute.

Spool has delivered the keynote presentations for The National Association of Government Webmasters, The National Association of Online Librarians, Higher Ed Webmasters, Agile 2009, South by Southwest Interactive, Web Advertising, Web Visions, the Usability Professionals Association, CHI (conference), the Information Architecture Summit, UX Australia, UX Lisbon, UX London, Drupal Con 2011, An Event Apart, Designing for People Amsterdam, UPA China, the Norwegian Computer Society, the British Computer Society, the Society for Technical Communication, and the Federal Webmasters Society.

In 2011, the Stevens Award was given to Spool, "whose quiet evangelism of usability and the practical outcomes of methods and tools had a wide-ranging influence on how we think about making systems effective."

Current activities 
Spool spends time working with research teams, consults with organizations so they can better understand how to solve their design problems, and works with reporters and industry analysts on the state of design. In addition to being a speaker at more than 20 conferences every year, Spool presents almost weekly for various groups.

Spool also sits on the editorial board for Rosenfeld Media, a user experience publishing house.

The Center Centre 
With the help of a successful Kickstarter campaign, in 2014, Jared co-founded the Center Centre, "a new, bricks-and-mortar user experience design school for adults," with Dr. Leslie Jensen-Inman.

Bibliography
Books
 Spool, Jared M. & Robert Hoekman, Jr. Web Anatomy: Interaction Design Frameworks that Work.
 Spool, Jared M., Rosalee J. Wolfe & Daniel M. McCracken. User-Centered Web Site Development: A Human-Computer Interaction Approach.
 Spool, Jared M., Carolyn Snyder, Tara Scanlon & Terri DeAngelo. Web Site Usability: A Designer's Guide.
 Jeffrey Rubin & Dana Chisnell, Spool, Jared M. (Forward), Handbook of Usability Testing: How to Plan, Design, and Conduct Effective Tests.

Articles
1993. "User involvement in the design process: why, when & how?" INTERCHI 1993: 251-254
1994. "ProductUsability: survival techniques." CHI Conference Companion 1994: 365-366 
1994. "Using a game to teach a design process." CHI Conference Companion 1994: 117-118 
1995. "CHI 95 Conference Companion" 1995: 395-396 
1995. "User Interface Engineering: fostering creative product development." CHI 95 Conference Companion 1995: 166-167 
1997. "Product Usability: Survival Techniques." CHI Extended Abstracts 1997: 154-155 
1997. "Measuring Website Usability." CHI Extended Abstracts 1997: 125 
2002. "Usability in practice: alternatives to formative evaluations-evolution and revolution." CHI Extended Abstracts 2002: 891-897 
2002. "Usability in practice: formative usability evaluations - evolution and revolution." CHI Extended Abstracts 2002: 885-890 
2003. " Evaluating globally: how to conduct international or intercultural usability research." CHI Extended Abstracts 2003: 704-705 
2003. "The "magic number 5": is it enough for web testing?" CHI Extended Abstracts 2003: 698-699 
2005. "The great debate: can usability scale up?" CHI Extended Abstracts 2005: 1174-1175 
2007. "Get real!": what's wrong with hci prototyping and how can we fix it? CHI Extended Abstracts 2007: 1913-1916

References

External links
 User Interface Engineering (UIE) official website
 Jared Spool on Slideshare
 The Magic of Jared Spool
 The Center Centre

Living people
1960 births
Usability
Web design
Web developers
Computer programmers
Human–computer interaction researchers
American bloggers
American technology writers
American designers
American podcasters
21st-century American non-fiction writers